Mr. Doodle Kicks Off is a 1938 American comedy film directed by Leslie Goodwins and written by Bert Granet. The film stars Joe Penner, June Travis, Richard Lane, Ben Alexander and Billy Gilbert. The film was released on October 7, 1938, by RKO Pictures.

Plot

Ellory Bugs has offered a huge donation to his old alma mater, Taylor Tech, which is to be paid only if his son, Jimmie "Doodle" Bugs, becomes a football hero. But "Doodle" tips the scales at 143 pounds and is more interested in the band than the football team. Janice Martin, daughter of the college president, is the great thing in "Doodle's" life, but she despises him and has eyes only for Mickey Wells, the school football star. "Doodle" is consoled by Professor Minorous, of the Greek Mythology department who tells him that the gods will solve all of his problems, and starts right in to make communications with these worthies by means of countless and meaningless blackboard equations.

Cast 
Joe Penner as Jimmie 'Doodle' Bugs
June Travis as Janice Martin
Richard Lane as Assistant Coach 'Offsides' Jones
Ben Alexander as Larry Weldon
Billy Gilbert as Professor Minorous
Jack Carson as Football Player Rochet
Alan Bruce as Mickey Wells
George Irving as College President Martin
William B. Davidson as Ellory Bugs, Jimmie's Father
Pierre Watkin as Mr. Wondel
Frank M. Thomas as Coach Hammond
Wesley Barry as 1st Sophomore
Robert Parrish as 2nd Sophomore

References

External links 
 

1938 films
American black-and-white films
RKO Pictures films
Films directed by Leslie Goodwins
1938 comedy films
American comedy films
1930s English-language films
1930s American films